Luka Čančarević (born 7 June 1984) is a Serbian football midfielder who last played for Sloboda Užice in Serbian First League.

References

External links
 
 Luka Čančarević stats at utakmica.rs
 

1984 births
Living people
Sportspeople from Užice
Association football midfielders
Serbian footballers
FK Sloboda Užice players
FK Jagodina players
FK Jedinstvo Užice players
Serbian SuperLiga players
Serbian expatriate footballers
Expatriate footballers in Sweden
Serbian expatriate sportspeople in Sweden
IF Limhamn Bunkeflo (men) players